Æthelwold was a common Anglo Saxon name.  It may refer to:

Royalty and nobility
King Æthelwold of Deira, King of Deira, d. 655
King Æthelwold of East Anglia, King of East Anglia, d. 664
King Æthelwold Moll of Northumbria, King of Northumbria, d. post-765
Æthelwold ætheling, son of King Æthelred of Wessex, d. 902
Æthelwald, Ealdorman of East Anglia, son of Æthelstan Half-King, d. 962

Saints
Saint Æthelwold (hermit), hermit on Inner Farne, d. 699; feast kept 23 March
Saint Æthelwold (bishop of Lindisfarne), Abbot of Melrose and Bishop of Lindisfarne, d. 740; feast kept 12 February
Saint Æthelwold of Winchester, Bishop of Winchester, d. 984; feast kept 1 August

Other clerics
Æthelweald, Bishop of Dunwich, mid-9th century
Æthelwold (bishop of Lichfield), Bishop of Lichfield, d. 845
Æthelwold (bishop of Dorchester), Bishop of Dorchester, d. 950
Æthelwold II (bishop of Winchester), Bishop of Winchester, d. 1012
Æthelwold (bishop of Carlisle), Bishop of Carlisle, d. 1157